Takashi Kimura may refer to:

 Kengo Kimura (born 1953), retired Japanese professional wrestler, ring name Takashi Kimura
 Takashi Kimura (water polo) (born 1950), Japanese former water polo player
 Takashi Kimura, a.k.a. t-kimura, performer in and producer of the Japanese music group M.O.V.E